Goals scored by goalkeepers are a somewhat rare event in football. Goalkeepers spend the majority of a match in the penalty area of their own team, a marked area around the goal they are defending in which they can handle the ball, in order to defend their goal. It is highly unusual for a goalkeeper to move far beyond this area and join an attack, as this leaves the defence vulnerable to long-distance attempts until the goalkeeper can return to defend it.

The most prolific goalscoring goalkeepers are those who take penalties or free kicks. Other occasions where goalkeepers sometimes score include set pieces where a goalkeeper joins an attack as a team is chasing a goal in order to prevent a defeat, or from goal kicks or otherwise regular clearances which travel the length of the pitch into the opposite goal. These types of instances are generally extremely rare and when they do happen it is generally considered a fluke or a stroke of luck rather than the intended consequence.

Records
The record for most goals is held by the Brazilian Rogério Ceni, with 131 goals. He scored his 100th goal in a 2–1 win for São Paulo on 27 March 2011.

In addition to having the second most goals (67), Paraguayan José Luis Chilavert has recorded the most goals scored in international matches (8), is only the second goalkeeper to score a hat-trick, and in 2000, while playing with Vélez Sarsfield, he and Argentine goalkeeper Roberto Bonano with River Plate both scored in the same Copa Mercosur match.

On 2 November 2013, Stoke City goalkeeper Asmir Begović scored a goal which was the fastest for a professional goalkeeper in football history (13 seconds).

On 27 April 1985, SV Darmstadt 98 goalkeeper Wilhelm Huxhorn broke the record for the longest goal in football history (103 metres / 112.6 yards), in a match against Fortuna Köln. However, the longest goal to have been officially recorded in the Guinness World Records was scored by Tom King of Newport County, on 19 January 2021 against Cheltenham Town.

List
The following list comprises goalkeepers who have scored in a professional national or international competition.

Bold names indicate keepers active during the 2022–23 season.

See also 
 List of top international women's football goalscorers by country
 List of women's footballers with 100 or more international goals
 List of top international men's football goalscorers by country
 List of men's footballers with 50 or more international goals
 List of outfield association footballers who played in goal
 List of men's footballers with 500 or more goals
 List of goalkeepers who have scored in the Premier League

References 

Goalscoring goalkeepers
+
Association football records and statistics
Association football player non-biographical articles